This is a list of flag bearers who have represented Turkey at the Olympics.

Flag bearers carry the national flag of their country at the opening ceremony of the Olympic Games.

See also
Turkey at the Olympics

References

Turkey at the Olympics
Turkey
Olympic flagbearers